Harry W. Flannery (March 13, 1900 – March 11, 1975) was an American journalist and author. He was the Berlin correspondent for the news division of the Columbia Broadcasting System in the years leading up to the United States involvement in World War II. In 1942, he published a bestseller about the experience, Assignment To Berlin. In 1968, he co-authored Which Way Germany, a study of the rise of fascism in pre-war Germany in the context of the Cold War Germany. In 1950, Flannery launched a failed bid for Congress as a Democrat for the 15th District in California. He briefly hosted a television talk show, Harry's Hat Rack and worked for the AFL–CIO in public relations until his retirement in 1967.

Early life 
Flannery was born in Greensburg, Pennsylvania on 13 March 1900; the son of John V. and Catherine (née Flynn) Flannery. He went to St. Paul’s High School in Scranton, Pennsylvania (1914) and Washington County High School in Hagerstown, Maryland (1915–18). He then attended Notre Dame University for four years and graduated with a Ph.B. in journalism in 1923.

Career 
Flannery held numerous positions as a reporter. He worked for the Hagerstown Herald in 1916 and later, also for the Hagerstown Mail, the Baltimore Sun, the Chicago City News Service and the Albany Evening News (until 1925). He was editor of the Hoosier Observer (Fort Wayne, Indiana) from 1931–32, before changing to radio broadcasting, serving as radio news editor for station WOWO (Fort Wayne, Indiana) from 1932–33, and news editor and analyst for KMOX (St. Louis, Missouri) from 1935-40.

CBS Radio 
Flannery worked as the Berlin correspondent for the Columbia Broadcasting System (CBS) from 1940–41, replacing William Shirer, and news analyst for CBS, West Coast from 1942–1948.

Post-war career 
In 1948, Harry became makeup editor for the Los Angeles Examiner. He quit this position in January 1950 to run for Congress as Democrat for the 15th District in California, a campaign he lost. In 1951, he became labor and foreign affairs editor for The Catholic Digest (St. Paul, Minnesota), before switching to an editorial position for the AFL News-Reporter from 1952-55. In 1955, Harry again became a radio journalist as AFL–CIO radio co-ordinator, a position he held until his retirement in 1967. For a couple of years after his retirement, he taught classes on labor issues at the UCLA Institute of Industrial Relations.

Organizations 
In addition, Harry helped organize the Catholic Labor Institute in Los Angeles and was a member of the Radio Writers Guild Council], the American Newspaper Guild and the American Federation of Radio and Television Artists. He was also a member of Broadcast Pioneers.

Author 
Harry wrote several books and numerous articles on foreign policy (especially Germany) and labor issues in North America, Latin America, and Europe. He is the author of the bestseller Assignment to Berlin (1942), co-author of Off Mike (1944), editor of Pattern for Peace (1962), co-author of The Church and the Working Men (1965), and Which Way Germany? (1968).

Personal life 
Harry married Ruth Carmody in 1937. They had one daughter, Patricia Yoder. After his first wife's death in 1968, he married Mary Heinemann in 1969.

Death 
Harry died on 11 March 1975 in Santa Monica, California.

References

External links and references 
 Washington Reports to the People via John F. Kennedy Presidential Library And Museum, Edward R. Murrow Interview with Harry W. Flannery, 26 July 1963.

1900 births
1975 deaths
Notre Dame College of Arts and Letters alumni
20th-century American journalists
People from Greensburg, Pennsylvania
20th-century American newspaper editors
American foreign policy writers
American trade unionists